Bryn Jones (20 May 1931 – October 1990) was a Welsh professional footballer who played as a left back.

Career
Born in Swansea, Jones played in the Football League for Swansea Town, Newport County, Bournemouth, Northampton Town and Watford, making a total of 408 appearances.

Later life and death
After retiring as a professional in 1967, Jones played semi-professionally for Chelmsford City and Folkestone Invicta before becoming a school teacher. He died in October 1990.

Family
Jones came from a footballing family. His father Ivor; uncles Shoni, Emlyn, Bryn and Bert; brother Cliff; and cousin Ken were also all players.

References

1931 births
1990 deaths
Welsh footballers
Swansea City A.F.C. players
Newport County A.F.C. players
AFC Bournemouth players
Northampton Town F.C. players
Watford F.C. players
Chelmsford City F.C. players
Folkestone Invicta F.C. players
English Football League players
Association football fullbacks